Way station may refer to:

 Way Station (novel), a 1963 science fiction novel by Clifford D. Simak
 "The Way Station", chapter 2 of The Dark Tower I – The Gunslinger by Stephen King
 Waystation Studio, private studio of Dave Way
 Way Station (band), a Ukrainian instrumental rock band
 Layover - a break in scheduled travel

See also
Mansio (Latin)
Station (disambiguation)
Stopover 
Whistle stop
Weigh station
:Category:Waystations